The Overland Stage is a 1927 American silent Western film directed by Albert S. Rogell and written by Marion Jackson. The film stars Ken Maynard, Kathleen Collins, Tom Santschi, Sheldon Lewis, Dot Farley and Florence Turner. The film was released on January 31, 1927, by First National Pictures.

Cast   
 Ken Maynard as Jack Jessup
 Kathleen Collins as Barbara Marshall
 Tom Santschi as Hawk Lespard
 Sheldon Lewis as Jules
 Dot Farley as Aunt Viney
 Florence Turner as Alice Gregg
 Jay Hunt as John Gregg
 William Malan as John Marshall
 Paul Hurst as Hell-A-Poppin' Casey
 Fred Burns as Butterfield

References

External links

 

1927 films
1920s English-language films
1927 Western (genre) films
First National Pictures films
Films directed by Albert S. Rogell
American black-and-white films
Silent American Western (genre) films
1920s American films